Gertma is a rural locality (a selo) in Kazbekovsky District, Republic of Dagestan, Russia. The population was 1,558 as of 2010. There are 18 streets.

Nationalities 
Avars live there.

Geography
Gertma is located 17 km southeast of Dylym (the district's administrative centre) by road. Guni and Khubar are the nearest rural localities.

References 

Rural localities in Kazbekovsky District